Maido Pakk (born 23 November 1989) is an Estonian footballer who is last known to have played for  in Norway from 2014 to 2018.

Career

Pärnu
Playing for Pärnu JK in his youth career, he moved to Pärnu JK Vaprus in 2008. He debuted for the main team on 8 March 2008.

He was banned for two games for representing Pärnu JK Vaprus for the 2008-09 Estonian Cup third round even though he was already suspended, also causing Pärnu to be disqualified and admonished.

Finland
Examined by Haka in 2009, Pakk boosted AC Kajaani to gain some experience, eventually moving to Haka that September, and debuted in a 0–1 collapse to FF Jaro and hurt his knees that November which left him out for some months. Assessed by SJK in summer 2010, the Estonian instead turned to Porin Palloilijat where he debuted as PoPa mustered a goal over JIPPO in the Ykkönen.

Tammeka
Pakk joined Tartu JK Tammeka in 2012. He left the club in 2013 due to a knee injury.

References

External links 
 
 
 

1989 births
Living people
Sportspeople from Pärnu
FC Haka players
Tartu JK Tammeka players
Pärnu JK Vaprus players
Expatriate footballers in Finland
Association football forwards
Estonian expatriate footballers
Porin Palloilijat players
Veikkausliiga players
Estonian footballers
Expatriate footballers in Norway
AC Kajaani players
Estonian expatriate sportspeople in Norway
Meistriliiga players
Pärnu Jalgpalliklubi players